Reshui could refer to the following:

Reshui Town (热水镇
Reshui, Jianping County, in Liaoning
Reshui, Heping County, in Guangdong
Reshui, Rucheng County, in Hunan
Reshui, Xuanwei, in Yunnan
Reshui Township (热水乡), township in Dulan County, Qinghai